Randolph "Randy" Hume Dean (born June 10, 1955) is a former American football quarterback who played for three seasons in the National Football League for the New York Giants from 1977–1979. He played college football at Northwestern. He is also a former handball player for the American team who competed in the 1976 Summer Olympics.

Family
He has an identical twin brother named Robert Dean.

Basketball
He played basketball at the Whitefish Bay High School. At the season 1973-74 he played three games for the Northwestern University.

Football
In 1972, he was named 1st Team All-Star for the Whitefish Bay High School. He played from the season 1974 until 1976 for the Northwestern University. He was punter for all three seasons and starting quarterback for his junior and senior season.

Professional career

New York Giants
In 1977 he was drafted by the New York Giants in round five as 117th overall draft.

In his short stint as a Quarterback for the New York Giants he completed a 1-yard touchdown pass in 1978.

Green Bay Packers
On August 4, 1980, the New York Giants traded him to the Green Bay Packers for a future draft pick. Three weeks later, on August 26, 1980, the Packers cut him

Handball
In 1975 he won the USA Team Handball Nationals with the Northwest Suburban YMCA.

In 1976 he placed third at the USA Team Handball Nationals with the Northwest Suburban YMCA.

In 1976, he and his brother were part of the American team which finished tenth in the Olympic tournament. He played all five matches and scored 24 goals.

After retirement
Between 1997 and 2002, he was Director of Development at the University School of Milwaukee. From 2002 to 2007, he was the Athletic Director. Between 2005 and 2008, he coached the boys basketball team.

In 2008, he became the Executive Director of the Pettit National Ice Center in Milwaukee.

See also
List of New York Giants players
List of National Football League Olympians
Robert Dean

References

External links

 
NFL statistics
College Football statistics

1955 births
Living people
Players of American football from Milwaukee
American football quarterbacks
Northwestern Wildcats football players
New York Giants players
American male handball players
Olympic handball players of the United States
Handball players at the 1976 Summer Olympics
American twins
People from Whitefish Bay, Wisconsin
Twin sportspeople
Northwestern Wildcats men's basketball players
Whitefish Bay High School alumni